Ludo Van Staeyen (born 11 December 1948) is a Belgian racing cyclist. He rode in the 1972 Tour de France.

References

1948 births
Living people
Belgian male cyclists
Place of birth missing (living people)